Gangga Negara is believed to be a lost semi-legendary Malay-Hindu kingdom mentioned in the Malay Annals that covered present day Beruas, Dinding and Manjung in the state of Perak, Malaysia with Raja Gangga Shah Johan as one of its kings. Researchers believe that the kingdom was centred at Beruas and it collapsed after an attack by King Rajendra Chola I of Tamilakam, between 1025 and 1026. Another Malay annals Hikayat Merong Mahawangsa known as Kedah Annals, Gangga Negara may have been founded by Merong Mahawangsa's son Raja Ganji Sarjuna of Kedah, allegedly a descendant of Alexander the Great or by the Khmer royalties no later than the 2nd century.

Origin
Gangga Negara means "a city on the Ganges" in Sanskrit, the name derived from Ganganagar in northwest India where the Kambuja peoples inhabited. The Kambujas are an Indo-Iranian clan of the Indo-European family, originally localised in Pamirs and Badakshan. Commonly known as Hindu traders, they built their colonies in Southeast Asia around 2,000 years ago at the Mekong valley and also at the Malay archipelago in Funan, Chenla, Champa, Khmer, Angkor, Langkasuka, Sailendra, Srivijaya, etc. Historians  found the Kambuja traders travelled from Gujarat to Sri Lanka and then to Ligor (Nakhon Sri Thammarat) of the northern Malay peninsula, overland to Thailand and Cambodia.

Beruas
The first research into the Beruas kingdom was conducted by Colonel James Low in 1849 and a century later, by H. G. Quaritch Wales. According to the Museum and Antiquities Department, both researchers agreed that the Gangga Negara kingdom existed between 100 and 1000 CE but could not ascertain the exact site. For years, villagers had unearthed artefacts believed to be from the ancient kingdoms, most of which are at present displayed at the Beruas Museum. Artefacts on display include a 128 kg cannon, swords, kris, coins, tin ingots, pottery from the Ming dynasty and various eras, and large jars. They can be dated back to the 5th and 6th century. Through these artefacts, it has been postulated that Pengkalan (Ipoh), Kinta Valley, Tanjung Rambutan, Bidor and Sungai Siput were part of the kingdom. Artifacts also suggest that the kingdom's centre might have shifted several times. Gangga Negara was renamed to Beruas after the establishment of Islam there.

Beruas tree
The district of Beruas has found some royal Acehnese gravestones and this evidence has it linked to another historical source that a Samudera Pasai prince from Aceh named Malik rested at a Beruas tree, this tree gave the area its name where it can still be found in the nearby villages of Pengkalan Baru and Batang Kubu.

Gallery

See also
 Bujang Valley
 Kota Gelanggi
 Champa
 Bhagiratha
 Indian maritime history

References

External links
 https://web.archive.org/web/20060623075820/http://www.sabrizain.demon.co.uk/malaya/hindu.htm
 https://web.archive.org/web/20060907055209/http://muzium.perak.gov.my/m_br_bahan.html Beruas Museum
 National Library of Malaysia. Sejarah Malaysia. URL accessed 14 April 2006.
 Laman Rasmi Muzium-Muzium Negeri Perak. URL accessed 14 April 2006.

History of Perak
Historical Hindu kingdoms
Early kingdoms in Malaysian history